This is a list of Legislative Council results for the Victorian 2022 state election.

Regions

Eastern Victoria 
Labor and the Liberal/National coalition were defending two seats each. The Shooters, Farmers and Fishers were defending one seat.

North-Eastern Metropolitan 
Labor and the Liberal Party were defending two seats each. The Transport Matters Party were defending one seat.

Northern Metropolitan 
Labor were defending two seats. The Liberal Party, Greens, and Reason were defending one seat each.

Northern Victoria 
Labor were defending two seats. The Liberal/National coalition, Derryn Hinch's Justice Party, and the Liberal Democrats were defending one seat each.

South-Eastern Metropolitan 
Labor were defending three seats. The Liberal Party and the Liberal Democrats were defending one seat each.

 9,334	1.99	-1.11

Southern Metropolitan 
Labor and the Liberal Party were defending two seats each. Sustainable Australia was defending one seat.

Western Metropolitan 
Labor were defending three seats. The Liberal Party and Derryn Hinch's Justice Party were defending one seat each.

Western Victoria 
Labor were defending two seats. The Liberal Party, Derryn Hinch's Justice Party, and the Animal Justice Party were defending one seat each.

References

Notes

2022 elections in Australia